Invisible Waves is a 2006 crime film by Thai director Pen-Ek Ratanaruang, with screenplay by Prabda Yoon, cinematography by Christopher Doyle, and starring Tadanobu Asano – all people that Pen-Ek had worked with on his previous film, Last Life in the Universe. It had its world premiere at the Berlin Film Festival and was also shown at the 2006 Bangkok International Film Festival and the 2006 Toronto International Film Festival.

Plot

Kyoji is a cook living in Macau. He works for a Thai restaurant in Hong Kong and has been having an affair with Seiko, the wife of his boss, Wiwat, who orders Kyoji to poison her. After the deed is done, Kyoji is ordered to leave Hong Kong. He consults with the mysterious Monk, who gives him money and advice to contact Lizard. Kyoji then boards a cruise ship, and is given a small, dreary cabin belowdecks, where nothing seems to work properly. In trying to find his way back topside, he gets lost. Finally, up on deck, he meets Noi. Noi has a baby named Nid, whom Kyoji finds hanging on the deck rail in a harness, where Noi left the child while she was swimming. Eventually, the ship reaches its destination, Phuket, Thailand, where real life-or-death adventures begin for Kyoji as he starts to put the pieces together about what he's done.

Cast
Tadanobu Asano as Kyoji 
Maria Cordero as Maria 
Toon Hiranyasap as Wiwat 
Kang Hye-jung as Noi 
Ken Mitsuishi as Lizard 
Eric Tsang as Monk 
Tomono Kuga as Seiko

Awards and nominations
 2006 Berlin International Film Festival – world premiere, nominated for Golden Bear.
 2006 Bangkok International Film Festival – in competition and opening film.

Oscar controversy
Invisible Waves had been announced as Thailand's entry for Best Foreign Language Film at the 79th Academy Awards by the Federation of National Film Associations of Thailand, but was then withdrawn and replaced with Ahimsa ... Stop to Run, which upset the Invisible Waves production company, Five Star Production. The film federation said that the reason for the change was that a print of the film wouldn't be available in time to send to the Academy for consideration, but Five Star, sales agent Fortissimo Films and distributor Palm Pictures stated that was not true. Earlier, the federation had opposed the film's opening of the 2006 Bangkok International Film Festival, stating that since it was an international co-production it was not truly a Thai film.

References

External links

2006 films
2000s Cantonese-language films
2000s English-language films
Five Star Production films
Hong Kong crime drama films
Japanese crime drama films
2000s Japanese-language films
Thai crime drama films
Thai-language films
Films directed by Pen-Ek Ratanaruang
Neo-noir